The Metropolitan Railway G Class consisted of four 0-6-4T steam locomotives, numbered 94 to 97. They were built by Yorkshire Engine Company in 1915. The class was unusual in carrying names as well as numbers, and were the last Metropolitan steam locomotives to do so.

Service
The G Class were used on various duties on the Metropolitan Railway mainline until 1937 when all four were transferred to the LNER. The LNER numbered them 6154–6157 and classified them as M2 Class. Two survived to the 1946 renumbering.

Withdrawal
All were withdrawn and scrapped between 1943 and 1948.

Names and numbers

References

External links 
 http://www.lner.info/locos/M/m2.shtml

G
0-6-4T locomotives
YEC locomotives
Railway locomotives introduced in 1915
Scrapped locomotives
Standard gauge steam locomotives of Great Britain